Clement Lambert "Count" Clemens (born with the surname of Ulatowski; November 21, 1886 – November 2, 1967) was a catcher in Major League Baseball from 1914 through 1916, playing for two Chicago-based teams.

External links

1886 births
1967 deaths
Notre Dame Fighting Irish baseball players
Major League Baseball catchers
Chicago Whales players
Chicago Cubs players
Baseball players from Chicago